"Love Somebody" is a song by Australian rock-pop band Noiseworks. It was released in August 1987 as the third single from their first studio album Noiseworks (1987) and peaked at number 50 on the Australian Kent Music Report.

Track listing
7" (651016 7)

12" (651016 6)

 Live tracks recorded on 3 June 1987 at Selina's Sydney

Charts

References

External links
 "Love Somebody" at Discogs

Noiseworks songs
1987 songs
1987 singles
CBS Records singles
Songs written by Jon Stevens
Song recordings produced by Mark Opitz